The 1898 Notre Dame football team was an American football team that represented the University of Notre Dame in the 1898 college football season. In its third season with Frank E. Hering as coach, the team compiled a 4–2 record, shut out four opponents, and outscored all opponents by a combined total of 155 to 34.

Schedule

References

Notre Dame
Notre Dame Fighting Irish football seasons
Notre Dame football